Housseyn Fardjallah (16 January 1993 – 20 November 2016) was an Algerian male weightlifter, competing in the 77 kg category and representing Algeria at international competitions.

As a junior, he competed at the 2010 Summer Youth Olympics in the boys' 69 kg event. He participated at the 2013 Mediterranean Games in the 77 kg event. He won the bronze medal at the 2015 African Games. He won the silver medal at the 2016 African Weightlifting Championships after finishing first in the snatch (150 kg) and second in the clean & jerk (185 kg).

Fardjallah died on 20 November 2016 in a traffic collision at age 23.

Major competitions

References

1993 births
2016 deaths
Algerian male weightlifters
Place of birth missing
Weightlifters at the 2010 Summer Youth Olympics
Road incident deaths in Algeria
Competitors at the 2013 Mediterranean Games
Mediterranean Games competitors for Algeria
21st-century Algerian people
20th-century Algerian people